Parade is an album by bassist Ron Carter that was recorded at Van Gelder Studio in 1979 and released on the Milestone label the following year.

Reception

The AllMusic review by Ron Wynn stated: "Bassist Carter heads a sterling mid-sized band with three trumpeters and saxophonists and two trombones. He handles the job of being both the primary and secondary rhythm support, while guests Joe Henderson, Jon Faddis, and Frank Wess, among others, provide some standout solos. The ensemble interaction clicks as well."

Track listing
All compositions by Ron Carter except where noted
 "Parade" – 9:01
 "A Theme in 3/4" – 5:54
 "Sometimes I Feel Like a Motherless Child" (Traditional) – 2:46
 "Tinderbox" – 5:07
 "Gypsy" – 8:41
 "G.J.T." – 4:48

Personnel
Ron Carter – piccolo bass, bass, arranger
Joe Henderson – tenor saxophone (tracks 1, 2 & 4-6)
Chick Corea – piano (tracks 1, 2 & 4-6)
Tony Williams – drums (tracks 1, 2 & 4-6)
Jon Faddis, John Frosk, Joe Shepley – trumpet, flugelhorn (tracks 1-4 & 6)
Urbie Green – trombone (tracks 1-4 & 6)
Tom Malone – bass trombone (tracks 1-4 & 6)
Jerry Dodgion – flute, clarinet, alto saxophone (tracks 1-4 & 6)
Frank Wess – flute, clarinet, tenor saxophone (tracks 1-4 & 6)
Wade Marcus – horn arranger and conductor (tracks 1-4 & 6)

References

Milestone Records albums
Ron Carter albums
1979 albums
Albums recorded at Van Gelder Studio